The Marburg Colloquy was a meeting at Marburg Castle, Marburg, Hesse, Germany, which attempted to solve a disputation between Martin Luther and Ulrich Zwingli over the Real Presence of Christ in the Eucharist. It took place between 1 October and 4 October 1529. The leading Protestant reformers of the time attended at the behest of Philip I of Hessen. Philip's primary motivation for this conference was political; he wished to unite the Protestant states in political alliance, and to this end, religious harmony was an important consideration.

After the Diet of Speyer had confirmed the edict of Worms, Philip I felt the need to reconcile the diverging views of Martin Luther and Ulrich Zwingli in order to develop a unified Protestant theology. Besides Luther and Zwingli, the reformers Stephan Agricola, Johannes Brenz, Martin Bucer, Caspar Hedio, Justus Jonas, Philipp Melanchthon, Johannes Oecolampadius, Andreas Osiander, and Bernhard Rothmann participated in the meeting.

If Philip wanted the meeting to be a symbol of Protestant unity he was disappointed. Luther and Zwingli fell out over the sacrament of the Eucharist.

Background

Philip of Hesse had a political motivation to unify all the leading Protestants because he believed that as a divided entity they were vulnerable to Charles V. As a unified force, they would appear to be more powerful. Religious harmony was vital amongst the Protestants for there to be a unification.

Participants

The colloquy
 
Although the two prominent reformers, Luther and Zwingli, found a consensus on fourteen theological points, they could not find agreement on the fifteenth point pertaining to the Eucharist. Timothy George, an author and professor of Church History, summarized the incompatible views, "On this issue, they parted without having reached an agreement. Both Luther and Zwingli agreed that the bread in the Supper was a sign. For Luther, however, that which the bread signified, namely the body of Christ, was present "in, with, and under" the sign itself. For Zwingli, though, sign and thing signified were separated by a distance—the width between heaven and earth."

Underlying this disagreement was their theology of Christ. Luther believed that the human body of Christ was ubiquitous (present in all places) and so present in the bread and wine. This was possible because the attributes of God infused Christ's human nature. Luther emphasized the oneness of Christ's person. Zwingli, who emphasized the distinction of the natures, believed that while Christ in his deity was omnipresent, Christ's human body could only be present in one place, that is, at the right hand of the Father. The executive editor for Christianity Today magazine carefully detailed the two views that would forever divide the Lutheran and Reformed view of the Supper:

Near the end of the colloquy when it was clear an agreement would not be reached, Philipp asked Luther to draft a list of doctrines all that both sides agreed upon. The Marburg Articles, based on what would become the Articles of Schwabach, had 15 points, and every person at the colloquy could agree on the first 14. The 15th article of the Marburg Articles reads:

The failure to find agreement resulted in strong emotions on both sides. "When the two sides departed, Zwingli cried out in tears, 'There are no people on earth with whom I would rather be at one than the [Lutheran] Wittenbergers.'" Because of the differences, Luther initially refused to acknowledge Zwingli and his followers as Christians, though following the colloquy the two Reformers showed relatively more mutual respect in their writings.

Aftermath
At the later Diet of Augsburg, the Zwinglians and Lutherans again explored the same territory as that covered in the Marburg Colloquy and presented separate statements which showed the differences in opinion.

See also
First war of Kappel (1529)

References

External links
The Marburg Articles (1529) (Text of the 15 Marburg Articles), German History in Documents and Images, Translated by Ellen Yutzy Glebe, from the German source: D. Martin Luthers Werke, Kritische Gesamtausgabe, Band 30, Teil 3. Weimar, 1910, pp. 160–71.
Huldreich Zwingli, the Reformer of German Switzerland edited by Samuel Macauley Jackson et al., 1903. Online from Google Books
 Phillip Cary. Luther: Gospel, Law and Reformation, [sound recording], Lecture 14. 2004, The Teaching Company Limited Partnership
 

1529 in Europe
Marburg
History of Hesse
Lutheran Eucharistic theology
Marburg
Martin Luther